A sextet is a group of six people working together, usually musicians.

Sextet may also refer to:

 Sextet (Penderecki), a 2000 chamber music composition by Krzysztof Penderecki
 Sextet (Poulenc), a 1931/32 chamber music composition by Francis Poulenc
 Sextet (Reich), a 1985 chamber music composition by Steve Reich
 Sextet (Carla Bley album), 1987
 Sextet (A Certain Ratio album), 1982
 Sextet, in computing units of information, a group of 6 bits

See also
 :Category:Compositions for string sextet
 Sextet for Horns and String Quartet (Beethoven) (c. 1795)
 Sextette, a 1978 film starring Mae West
 
 
 Hexad (disambiguation)